Selfie With Daughter was an Indian social media campaign that was launched with an aim to promote the feeling of pride for being parent of a girl child and hence improving child sex ratio in the country. The campaign asked parents to post selfies with their daughters. The campaign later picked other objectives and also endorsed educating girls in India and supporting them with economic freedom.

History 
The campaign was started by Sunil Jaglan, who was a sarpanch at Bibipur - a village in Jind Haryana in 2015  and was later picked and promoted by Prime Minister Narendra Modi through a radio program. An app was also launched by Indian president Pranab Mukherjee to increase awareness around female foeticide in India.  In 2019, an All-woman selfie campaign was also launched that focused on single mothers. The campaign saw a lot of participation from North East India. In 2021, the campaign was launched in Nepal in partnership with Nepal Internet Foundation. A Thank You PM program was also launched subsequently that thanked Prime Minister Narendra Modi on father's day for promoting girl child literacy.

The campaign had been mentioned multiple times by Prime Minister at his Mann Ki Baat program. He said in his speech in June 2015,

"I liked this idea, and that too for a special reason. In Haryana, the number of girls in comparison to boys is dismally low. Around another 100 districts in the country have a similar dismal situation of skewed sex ratio. But it is the worst in Haryana. In that very same Haryana, if a Sarpanch of a small indistinct village lends this meaning to the “Beti Bachao Beti Padhao” programme, then I certainly get overwhelmed."

and requested the citizens to follow the trend and post a selfie with daughter. In another speech in September, he referred to the campaign as a movement and a silent revolution. Three years later, In November 2018, he continued to talk about the campaign in his program, "Who would have imagined that a small campaign “selfie with daughter”starting from a small village in Haryana would spread not only throughout the country but also across other countries as well." Former President Pranab Mukherjee also referred to the campaign as a world-wide movement against female foeticide and sex selection.

Impact 
According to a report published by the Indian government, the campaign worked because it used Failure Bias. It also told people what the norm was and then demonstrated how thousands of others were following the norm. As per The SDG Communicator, the website had more a hundred thousand pictures with twenty seven thousand families participating in 2019.

References 

Social movements in India